Get Rad is Inspection 12's sixth full-length album. It was released independently in 2003. In 2004,  it was released internationally by Floppy Cow Records and in the US by Suburban Home Records. Takeover Records rereleased it with the original artwork in 2005. Unlike their previous recordings, Get Rad deviates quite a bit from the usual punk rock sound, incorporating a lot of unorthodox instruments for the genre, containing elements of folk rock and bluegrass.

Track listing
"Homesick" – 4:10
"Coup de Grace" – 4:59
"Feelin' Like Freddie" – 4:22
"Labels are for Cans" – 4:43
"Again" – 3:52
"In the Dark" – 4:08
"The Naked at School Dream" – 3:40
"Everyday" – 4:20
"Out of My League" - 3:37
"I Hate Soap Operas" - 2:11
"A Better Friend" - 0:45
"Reckoned Wrong" - 1:01
"Terrified" - 2:25
"You Can Call Me Al" - 3:44
"Home" - 3:18
"I'm Fine; I Can Drive" - 3:42
"Nothing to Lose" - 8:27

Performance credits

Band
Timothy John Grisnik - drums, percussion and vocals
Peter Michael Mosely - guitar, piano, organ and vocals
Daniel McCormick McLintock - vocals, bass guitar and guitar

Additional musicians
Tina Rodas - cello
Bobby Davis - French horn, "Again"
Kyle David Hlubek - guitar, "Labels are for Cans"
Christopher Matthew Grondin - guitar, "Feelin' Like Freddie" and "You Can Call Me Al"
James Ardolino - percussion, "The Naked at School Dream"
Kevin Valent - percussion, "The Naked at School Dream"
Amanda Marie Hill - vocals, "Homesick", "You Can Call Me Al" and "Coup de Grace"
Mark O'Quinn - vocals, "Homesick"
Jonas Ted Bond - vocals, "In the Dark"
Ryan Key - vocals, "Nothing to Lose"
Jonathan "J-Bag" Farmand - Yahtzee, "Everyday"

Technical credits
Paul Vincent Lapinski - engineering, mixing, mastering
Daryl Phenneger - assistant engineering

References

External links
Inspection 12 official website

2003 albums
Inspection 12 albums